Johnsville is a census-designated place (CDP) in Plumas County, California, United States. The population was 20 at the 2010 census, down from 21 at the 2000 census.

Geography
Johnsville is located at  (39.779359, -120.693855).

Demographics

2010
The 2010 United States Census reported that Johnsville had a population of 20. The population density was 1.4 people per square mile (0.6/km2). The racial makeup of Johnsville was 20 (100.0%) White, 0 (0.0%) African American, 0 (0.0%) Native American, 0 (0.0%) Asian, 0 (0.0%) Pacific Islander, 0 (0.0%) from other races, and 0 (0.0%) from two or more races.  Hispanic or Latino of any race were 0 persons (0.0%).

The Census reported that 20 people (100% of the population) lived in households, 0 (0%) lived in non-institutionalized group quarters, and 0 (0%) were institutionalized.

There were 11 households, out of which 0 (0%) had children under the age of 18 living in them, 8 (72.7%) were opposite-sex married couples living together, 0 (0%) had a female householder with no husband present, 0 (0%) had a male householder with no wife present.  There were 0 (0%) unmarried opposite-sex partnerships, and 0 (0%) same-sex married couples or partnerships. 3 households (27.3%) were made up of individuals, and 0 (0%) had someone living alone who was 65 years of age or older. The average household size was 1.82.  There were 8 families (72.7% of all households); the average family size was 2.13.

The population was spread out, with 0 people (0%) under the age of 18, 1 people (5.0%) aged 18 to 24, 0 people (0%) aged 25 to 44, 14 people (70.0%) aged 45 to 64, and 5 people (25.0%) who were 65 years of age or older.  The median age was 57.5 years. For every 100 females, there were 122.2 males.  For every 100 females age 18 and over, there were 122.2 males.

There were 103 housing units at an average density of 7.5 per square mile (2.9/km2), of which 10 (90.9%) were owner-occupied, and 1 (9.1%) were occupied by renters. The homeowner vacancy rate was 9.1%; the rental vacancy rate was 0%.  18 people (90.0% of the population) lived in owner-occupied housing units and 2 people (10.0%) lived in rental housing units.

2000
As of the census of 2000, there were 21 people, 12 households, and 3 families residing in the CDP. The population density was 1.5 people per square mile (0.6/km2). There were 71 housing units at an average density of 5.2 per square mile (2.0/km2). The racial makeup of the CDP was 80.95% White, 4.76% Asian, 14.29% from other races. 14.29% of the population were Hispanic or Latino of any race.

There were 12 households, out of which 16.7% had children under the age of 18 living with them, 25.0% were married couples living together, and 75.0% were non-families. 66.7% of all households were made up of individuals, and 8.3% had someone living alone who was 65 years of age or older. The average household size was 1.75 and the average family size was 3.67.

In the CDP, the population was spread out, with 19.0% under the age of 18, 4.8% from 18 to 24, 23.8% from 25 to 44, 47.6% from 45 to 64, and 4.8% who were 65 years of age or older. The median age was 46 years. For every 100 females, there were 90.9 males. For every 100 females age 18 and over, there were 112.5 males.

The median income for a household in the CDP was $6,042, and the median income for a family was $0. Males had a median income of $0 versus $48,750 for females. The per capita income for the CDP was $8,030. There are 100.0% of families living below the poverty line and 86.5% of the population, including 100.0% of under eighteens and none of those over 64.

Politics

Notable people
 George Quellich, baseball player

References

Census-designated places in Plumas County, California
Census-designated places in California